Mazipredone (brand name Depersolon), also known as depersolone, is a synthetic glucocorticoid corticosteroid which is or has been marketed in the Czech Republic and Hungary.

References

Diketones
Diols
Glucocorticoids
Piperazines
Pregnanes